Scouting and Guiding in the Pitcairn Islands is served by Pitcairn Island Sea Scouts, an initiative of the local police officer who was installed by the British government for the first time following the discovery of child abuse in 2004.

Scouting was introduced to Pitcairn Island in 2011 by Sergeant Russell Torr of the Pitcairn Island Police Force.  The British government has an agreement with the government of New Zealand to provide police officers to this overseas territory of the United Kingdom.

The officer is supplied by New Zealand and runs the Sea Scout group. In 2011, there were 7 members, both male and female, from a population of approximately 50, and leaders change often as the police officers usually remain on the island for a year, then are rotated.

Scouting on the island is a unique blend of traditional Scouting teaching, police training and island life. The Scouts learn valuable skills, as by 2045, there will not be enough young people to do the hard manual work like rowing boats out to the supply ship that comes every quarter. Pitcairn Island does not have an airport, airstrip or seaport; the islanders rely on longboats to ferry people and goods between visiting ships and shore through Bounty Bay.

The green triangle and blue sky represents the island rising from the ocean.

References

Overseas branches of Scouting and Guiding associations
The Scout Association
Scouting and Guiding by country
Organisations based in the Pitcairn Islands